The 1991 United States Senate special election in Pennsylvania was held on November 5, 1991, after incumbent Republican Senator John Heinz died in a plane crash on April 4 of that year. Democrat Harris Wofford was appointed to the seat by Governor Bob Casey, and won the general election over Republican Dick Thornburgh, a former Governor and U.S. Attorney General. Wofford became Pennsylvania's first Democratic Senator since Joseph S. Clark Jr. left office in 1969. Major-party candidates for this election were chosen by party committees, as the vacancy had happened too late for a primary to be held.

This was the first time a Democrat won this seat since 1940.

Background

Death of Senator John Heinz

On April 4, 1991, United States Senator John Heinz was killed when his Piper Aerostar propeller-driven aircraft collided in mid-air with a Bell 412 helicopter over Merion Elementary School in Lower Merion Township, a suburb northwest of Philadelphia. All five people in both aircraft were killed. Two school children on the ground were also killed by falling debris.

Governor of Pennsylvania Bob Casey memorialized Heinz as "a distinguished and dedicated son of Pennsylvania." Heinz had been re-elected to his third term in the Senate in 1988 and the term was not set to expire until 1995. Governor Casey was empowered to appoint an interim Senator to fill the vacant seat until a successor could be duly elected in November, as required by statute. In the immediate aftermath of the Senator's death, Casey declined to name any potential replacement.

Because Heinz's death came in April, it was too late for primaries to determine the party nominees for the special election. Instead, the state party committees would determine the nominees for the special election.

Republican nomination

Candidates
 Dick Thornburgh, U.S. Attorney General and former Governor of Pennsylvania

Declined
 Stephen Freind, State Representative from Delaware County
 Tom Ridge, U.S. Representative from Erie

After Heinz's death, the Republican Party scheduled a statewide meeting on May 11 to choose their nominee, subject to the result of a series of regional caucuses. The leading candidate was U.S. Attorney General Dick Thornburgh, and parallel to Casey's struggle to find a willing appointee, Republicans struggled to get Thornburgh into the race. By the end of April, Thornburgh had not announced his intent, and at least one regional caucus was postponed.

U.S. Representative Tom Ridge announced that he would run if and only if Thornburgh declined.

Democratic nomination

Nominee
 Harris Wofford, Pennsylvania Secretary of Labor and Industry

Declined appointment
 Lee Iacocca, CEO of Chrysler
 Thomas W. Kelly, retired Lieutenant General of the United States Army

Without an open popular vote for the nomination, Casey's appointment would almost certainly determine the Democratic nominee for the November election.

Casey offered the seat to Lieutenant General Thomas W. Kelly, who retired from active duty in April and was the public face of the popular Gulf War as head of the Pentagon's National Military Command Center. Kelly, who was born and raised in Philadelphia but no longer lived in Pennsylvania, declined.

In early May, Casey also privately offered the seat to Chrysler executive Lee Iacocca, who had elevated his political profile by criticism of President George H. W. Bush's industrial policy, with the understanding that Iacocca would immediately begin running for the special election for the remainder of Heinz's term. Iacocca, a native of Allentown who lived in the Michigan suburbs, would have had to relocate to Pennsylvania before November to stand for election.

On May 6, Iacocca publicly declined Casey's offer of appointment, citing his family and corporate obligations. After Iacocca's public withdrawal, former mayor of Philadelphia Bill Green III was considered the front-runner and a Casey aide confirmed that Green was under consideration. U.S. Representatives William H. Gray and John Murtha, Pittsburgh lawyer Art Rooney II, and Superior Court Judge Kate Ford Elliott were also mentioned as potential appointments.  The sole remaining candidate who publicly expressed his interest in the role, Lieutenant Governor Mark Singel, was nixed by Casey. Appointing Singel would have elevated Senate President pro tem Robert Jubelirer, a Republican, to Singel's office. 

After Iacocca declined Casey's offer, the Governor came under extensive criticism from Republicans for the lengthy time he took to choose an appointee and his attempts to appoint non-residents; both Republicans and Democrats agreed that his primary focus was finding the strongest political candidate to take on U.S. Attorney General Dick Thornburgh, the likely Republican nominee, in November. 

On May 8, Casey settled on Pennsylvania Secretary of Labor and Industry Harris Wofford as Heinz's successor. Wofford had previously served as an advisor to President John F. Kennedy and the President of Bryn Mawr College, as well as Casey's law partner. Casey's aides said that Wofford had been a contender since Heinz's death. Wofford was sworn in that day and immediately announced that he would be a candidate in the special election.

General election

Candidates
 Harris Wofford, incumbent U.S. Senator and former State Secretary of Labor (Democratic)
 Dick Thornburgh, U.S. Attorney General and former Governor of Pennsylvania (Republican)

Campaign
At the time of Wofford's appointment, some speculated his liberal credentials could cause problems in a state that had not elected a Democrat to the Senate since 1962, but Democratic operative Paul Tully argued that his liberalism would be advantageous in the Philadelphia suburbs, which were key to any statewide win.

As little as five months before the election, Wofford's own internal polling showed him trailing Thornburgh by upwards of 40 points. Both the state and national Democratic establishment were tepid toward Wofford, feeling that Casey had missed a prime opportunity to select a top tier candidate. Wofford struggled to fundraise and had difficulty communicating his message to the voters; because he had a bureaucratic as opposed to a political background, he was long-winded and received criticism in the media. With a large lead in the polls, Thornburgh laid back to avoid mistakes, which allowed Wofford to gain traction. Despite his elite upbringing, Wofford connected well with working class voters by making healthcare access the major plank of his campaign. He also successfully derided Thornburgh for his connections to President George H. W. Bush, whose popularity was steeply declining due to a recession. Thornburgh was unable to mount credible attacks against Wofford until after the Democrat had already established himself.

Results

Wofford was not only victorious in traditionally Democratic areas, such as Philadelphia city, Scranton, and metro Pittsburgh, but he also ran well in Republican strongholds. Wofford won three of the four suburban Philadelphia counties, which, although socially liberal, were strongly aligned with Republicans; Wofford's "roll-up-your-sleeves" campaign also allowed him to perform stronger than most Democrats in rural regions and to win several usually Republican counties with a strong labor base.

Aftermath
Wofford's appointment and re-election increased the Democratic Senate majority to 57 seats, diminishing Republican hopes of taking back the Senate in 1992.

Wofford's victory proved to be a harbinger for Bill Clinton's victory in the presidential election held a year later. Wofford's campaign was run by Paul Begala and James Carville, who would go on to play key roles in the Clinton campaign. Democrats did very well across the state including in Allegheny County (Pittsburgh) and Philadelphia County (Philadelphia).

See also 
 1990 United States Senate elections
 1992 United States Senate elections

References

Pennsylvania
1991
Pennsylvania 1991
United States Senate 1991
United States Senate
Pennsylvania Senate